George Brown was a Negro league pitcher in the 1920s.

A native of Oklahoma, Brown made his Negro leagues debut in 1925 with the St. Louis Stars. He pitched three seasons with St. Louis, and also played briefly for the Kansas City Monarchs in 1927.

References

External links
 and Seamheads

Place of birth missing
Place of death missing
Year of birth missing
Year of death missing
Kansas City Monarchs players
St. Louis Stars (baseball) players
Baseball pitchers
Baseball players from Oklahoma